Shab (born Shabnam Kamoii) is an American singer-songwriter originally from Tehran, Iran.  In 2020, She released her first single Spell On Me (co-written with Damon Sharpe and Eric Sanicola).  She has over 150,000 monthly listeners on Spotify, and is growing in popularity.

Personal life
Shab was born in Tehran, Iran and is one of 13 children.  Her father, a petroleum executive, died when she was six months old.  At the age of 8, Shab fled alone to Germany during the Iranian revolution, and lived with her sister.  Six years later, she moved to Baltimore where other members of her family were already living.  In 2003, Shab began writing songs in her native Farsi, but would not record any until 2015.  She spent the interim time working for various family businesses and attending law school.  She currently resides in Baltimore and Dallas with her partner and two children.  She also supports several charities including The Kynect Foundation (dedicated to the needs of
children, military veterans and emergency workers,) as well as Hope Supply Co. (a non-profit that provides aid to homeless children.)

Musical career
In 2016, Shab moved to Dallas, Texas and continued recording new songs in Farsi.  In 2018 she began collaborating with Grammy-award winning producer Damon Sharpe, and together they recorded Down To The Wire and Spell On Me.  Spell On Me went on to chart at Number One on the Global Digital Music Chart, and Number Two on the British Commercial Pop Chart.  She is expected to release her first English album entitled Infinity in 2023.

References

Living people
American singer-songwriters
Singers from Tehran
Iranian emigrants to the United States
Year of birth missing (living people)